Major Charles Allix Lavington Yate, VC (14 March 1872 – 20 September 1914) was an English British Army officer and recipient of the Victoria Cross, the highest and most prestigious award for gallantry in the face of the enemy that can be awarded to British and Commonwealth forces.

Yate, from Madeley, Shropshire, attended the Royal Military College, Sandhurst, and joined the British Army. He saw service in British India, Mauritius, South Africa during the Second Boer War, as an observer during the Russo-Japanese War, and between 1908 and 1914 he was on the staff of the War Office in London.

Early life
Yate was born 14 March 1872 to the Reverend Prebendary George Edward Yate (1825–1908), the vicar of St Michael's Church, Madeley from 1859 to 1908. His cousin was Sir Charles Yate, 1st Baronet.

He was educated at Weymouth College, and graduated from the Royal Military College, Sandhurst, 9th out of 1,100 cadets.  He joined the 2nd Battalion, the King's Own Yorkshire Light Infantry as a second lieutenant on 13 August 1892, while it was stationed in Bombay. Promoted to lieutenant on 7 January 1894, he first saw action in India in the Tirah expedition from 1897 to 1898, for which he was awarded the medal and clasp of the Tirah Expedition. He was promoted to captain on 26 July 1899, and with his battalion was transferred to South Africa following the outbreak of the Second Boer War in October that year. The battalion took part in the battles of Belmont and Enslin in November 1899, where Yate was seriously wounded. After the war ended in June 1902, he transferred with the battalion to Malta, leaving Point Natal on the SS Staffordshire in October.

On 17 September 1903 he married at St George's Church, Hanover Square, London, Florence Helena Brigg, from Greenhead Hall, Yorkshire. There were no children.

He was promoted to the rank of major in 1912. Yate was fluent in French, German and Japanese, and could also speak Hindustani and Persian.

VC action
Yate was 42 years old, and a major in the 2nd Battalion, The King's Own Yorkshire Light Infantry, during the First World War when the following deed took place during the battle of Le Cateau for which he was awarded the VC.

On 26 August 1914 at Le Cateau, France, Major Yate commanded one of the two companies that remained to the end in the trenches, and when all other officers had been killed or wounded and ammunition exhausted, he led his 19 survivors against the enemy in a charge.

He was captured by the Germans and interned in Targau prisoner of war camp. After repeated attempts, he escaped a month later on 19 September 1914, but was quickly apprehended by local factory workers who suspected his appearance, and cut his own throat to avoid recapture and possible execution as a spy. He died on 20 September 1914.

Four other VCs were won that day at Le Cateau, including one by Lance Corporal Frederick William Holmes, who wrote of Yate:  Major Yate was a thorough gentleman and a great favourite with us all.  He had had a lot of experience in the Far East and at home, and I am sure that if he had lived he would have become a general.  He was always in front, and his constant cry was "Follow me!"

Yate is buried in grave II. G. 8. at the Commonwealth War Graves Commission Berlin South-Western Cemetery in Stahnsdorf, near Potsdam, Germany. He is also listed on the parish war memorial, now on The Green, at Madeley, and within St Michael's Church, Madeley.

The medal
His Victoria Cross is displayed at the King's Own Yorkshire Light Infantry Museum in the Doncaster Museum, England.

References

Monuments to Courage (David Harvey, 1999)
The Register of the Victoria Cross (This England, 1997)
VCs of the First World War - 1914 (Gerald Gliddon, 1994)

1872 births
1914 deaths
Burials in Germany
People from Madeley, Shropshire
Graduates of the Royal Military College, Sandhurst
British World War I recipients of the Victoria Cross
King's Own Yorkshire Light Infantry officers
British Army personnel of the Second Boer War
British Army personnel of World War I
British military personnel killed in World War I
British military personnel who committed suicide
British World War I prisoners of war
British military personnel of the Tirah campaign
World War I prisoners of war held by Germany
People of the Russo-Japanese War
British Army recipients of the Victoria Cross
Military personnel from Shropshire
Suicides by sharp instrument in Germany